Édouard Paul Dhorme (15 January 1881 in Armentières, Nord – 19 January 1966 in Roquebrune-Cap-Martin (Alpes-Maritimes)) was a French Assyriologist, Semitologist and translator of the Bible.

Career 
He was director of the French School of Biblical Archeology in Jerusalem from 1927 to 1930, and director of studies at École pratique des hautes études from 1933 to 1951, and a professor at Collège de France from 1945 to 1951. He was elected a member of the Académie des inscriptions et belles-lettres in 1948.

One of his greatest works treated of the religions of Babylon and Assyria. His French translation of the Old Testament was prepared under the direction of Gallimard at the Bibliothèque de la Pléiade. Along with Hans Bauer, Dhorme is credited with the decipherment of the Ugaritic writing system.

Principal publications 
 Études bibliques. Choix de textes religieux assyro-babyloniens, transcription, traduction, commentaire, Paris, 1907
 La Religion assyro-babylonienne : conférences données à l'Institut catholique de Paris, Paris, 1910 
 Études bibliques : Les livres de Samuel, Paris, 1910
 L'emploi métaphorique des noms de parties du corps en hébreu et en akkadien, Paris, 1923.
 Études bibliques : Le livre de Job. Introduction, traduction et commentaire, Paris, 1926 
 Langues et Écritures sémitiques, 1930
 La Poésie biblique. Introduction à la poésie biblique et trente chants de circonstance, Paris, 1931
 L'Evolution religieuse d'Israël. Tome I. La religion des Hébreux nomades, 1937
 Les Religions de Babylonie et d'Assyrie, suivi de Les Religions des Hittites et des Hourrites, des Phéniciens et des Syriens par René Dussaud, 1945 ; 1949
 Recueil Édouard Dhorme : études bibliques et orientales, Paris : Impr. Nationale, 1951   
 La Bible, Paris : Gallimard, 1956
 A Commentary on the Book of Job(translation into English and preface by Francis I. Andersen - Nelson 1983)

Bibliography 
Agnès Spycket, « Les Archives d'Édouard Dhorme (1881-1966) à la bibliothèque du Saulchoir » in Revue Biblique, 104:1 (1997): 5-39. Palmyrean and Syriac.
 Biographie d'Édouard Dhorme sur le site Persée

Connected Articles

 Marie-Joseph Lagrange
 René Dussaud
 Jean Bottéro

External links
 

French Assyriologists
Academic staff of the École pratique des hautes études
Members of the Académie des Inscriptions et Belles-Lettres
1881 births
People from Armentières
1966 deaths
French male non-fiction writers
20th-century French historians
Academic staff of the Collège de France
20th-century French translators
20th-century French male writers